Cultus Bay is a bay in Island County, in the U.S. state of Washington.

Cultus is a name derived from the Chinook Jargon meaning "worthless".

The Cultus Bay Estuary has been diked off, minimising open tidal exchange. A tide-gate and a small culvert allow for a little salt water exchange.

References

Bays of Washington (state)
Bays of Island County, Washington
Washington placenames of Native American origin